Erfan Khani  (born 15 August 1999) is an Iranian professional footballer who plays as a left-back for Azadegan League club Saipa.

References

1999 births
Living people
People from Tehran
Sportspeople from Tehran
Iranian footballers
Saipa F.C. players
Azadegan League players
Association football defenders
Iranian expatriate footballers
Expatriate footballers in Belgium
Iranian expatriate sportspeople in Belgium